Harami is a type of Japanese candlestick pattern represented by two bodies, the first of them, larger, with black or red body and the second one, white or green. Its name derives from the Japanese word that means “pregnant” because the graphic that shows resembles a pregnant woman. Generally, the Harami pattern candlestick shows a changing trend. Like other Japanese patterns can be bullish or bearish.

References

Japanese crafts